Union Presbyterian Church, also known as First Presbyterian Church of Wheatland, is a historic Presbyterian church located at Scottsville in Monroe County, New York. It is a mid-19th-century vernacular Romanesque Revival–style building.  It is composed of a three- by five-bay frame church with a -story rear wing that houses classrooms, offices, and kitchen facilities.

It was listed on the National Register of Historic Places in 2004.

References

External links
Scottsville Union Presbyterian Church - Presbytery of Genesee Valley

Churches on the National Register of Historic Places in New York (state)
Presbyterian churches in New York (state)
Churches in Monroe County, New York
National Register of Historic Places in Monroe County, New York